Philoblennidae is a family of crustaceans belonging to the order Cyclopoida.

Genera:
 Briarella Bergh, 1876
 Chondrocarpus Bassett-Smith, 1903
 Myzotheridion Laubier & Bouchet, 1976
 Nippoparasitus Uyeno, Ogasaka & Nagasawa, 2016
 Philoblenna Izawa, 1976

References

Cyclopoida